Dionysios Demetis (also Dionisis) is a Greek composer, born in 1979 in Athens. He studied piano at the Ethnikon Odion in Athens. He is best known for two of his compositions, "Moonlight" and "Abyss". He released his first CD of piano compositions in 2000, The Heart Wreck on SpinRecords, a California record label. In 2006, he released his second CD, The Mark of Innocence. Demetis is also the composer of the anthem of the International Society for Spacetime Physics.

References

External links
The Mark of Innocence website

1979 births
Living people
Musicians from Athens
Greek pianists
Greek composers
21st-century pianists